Sweden does not currently use the euro as its currency and has no plans to replace the existing Swedish krona in the near future. Sweden's Treaty of Accession of 1994 made it subject to the Treaty of Maastricht, which obliges states to join the eurozone once they meet the necessary conditions. Sweden maintains that joining the European Exchange Rate Mechanism II (ERM II), participation in which for at least two years is a requirement for euro adoption, is voluntary, and has chosen to remain outside pending public approval by a referendum, thereby intentionally avoiding the fulfilment of the adoption requirements.

Status

Sweden joined the European Union in 1995 and its accession treaty has since obliged it to adopt the euro once the country is found to comply with all the convergence criteria. However, one of the requirements for eurozone membership is two years' membership of ERM II, and Sweden has chosen not to join this mechanism, which would peg the Swedish currency to the euro ±2.25%. The Swedish krona (SEK) floats freely alongside other currencies.  Most of Sweden's major parties believe that it would be in the national interest to join, but they have all pledged to abide by the result of the referendum.

Olli Rehn, the EU commissioner for economic affairs, has said that it is up to Swedish people to decide when to adopt the euro.  However, the European Union is committed to European political integration through a single monetary unit, and European and International pressure for remaining nationalized currencies to be abolished persists.

Despite this, the euro can be used to pay for goods and services in some places in Sweden. (See below.) 

Sweden meets four of five conditions for joining the euro as of June 2022. The table below gives further details:

History

Early monetary unions in Sweden (1873–1914) 

On 5 May 1873 Denmark with Sweden fixed their currencies against gold and formed the Scandinavian Monetary Union. Prior to this date Sweden used Swedish riksdaler. In 1875 Norway joined this union. An equal valued krona of the monetary union replaced the three legacy currencies at the rate of 1 krona = ½ Danish rigsdaler = ¼ Norwegian speciedaler = 1 Swedish riksdaler. The new currency (krona) became a legal tender and was accepted in all three countries – Denmark, Sweden and Norway. This monetary union lasted until 1914, when it was brought to an end by World War I. As of 2014, the names of the currencies in each country have remained unchanged ("krona" in Sweden, "krone" in Norway and Denmark).

Joining the European Union
The Swedish European Union membership referendum of 1994 approved—with a 52% majority—the Accession Treaty and in 1995 Sweden joined the EU. According to the treaty Sweden is obliged to adopt the euro once it meets convergence criteria.

2003 referendum

A referendum held in September 2003 saw 55.9 percent vote against membership of the eurozone. As a consequence, Sweden decided in 2003 not to adopt the euro for the time being. If they had voted in favour, Sweden would have adopted the euro on 1 January 2006.

A majority of voters in Stockholm County voted in favour of adopting the euro (54.7% "yes", 43.2% "no"). In Skåne County the people voting "yes" (49.3%) outnumbered the people voting "no" (48.5%), although the invalid and blank votes resulted in no majority for either option. In all other polls in Sweden, the majority voted no.

Usage today

Some shops, hotels and restaurants may accept euros, often limited to notes and giving change in Swedish Krona. This is especially common in some border cities. Shops especially oriented towards foreign tourists are more likely to accept foreign currencies (such as the euro) than other shops. Payphones in Sweden were able to accept coins in both Swedish kronor and euro since the year 2000. The last payphone was dismantled in 2015.

Municipalities

Official currency status 
Matters such as official currency status and legal tender issues are decided by the Swedish parliament, and the euro is not an official currency of any part of Sweden. Nevertheless, politicians from some municipalities (see below) have claimed that the euro is an official currency of their municipalities. This means that the municipality has made an agreement with many shops that they should accept euros (in cash and credit cards). However this is not mandatory for the stores and the status as "official currency" is mostly a marketing device rather than a legal mandate.

Haparanda
The only Swedish city near the eurozone is Haparanda, where almost all stores accept euros as cash and often display prices in euros. Haparanda has become an important shopping city with the establishment of IKEA and other stores. 200,000 Finns live within 150 km distance.

Some municipalities, especially Haparanda, wanted to have the euro as a legally official currency, and, for example, contract salaries in euros to employees from Finland. However, this is illegal due to tax laws and salary rules. (The actual payment can be in euro, handled by the bank, but the salary contract and the tax documentation must be in kronor).

Haparanda's budget is presented in both currencies. Haparanda has a close cooperation with the neighbour city of Tornio, Finland.

Höganäs
The town of Höganäs claimed to have adopted the euro for shops on 1 January 2009. From that date, all residents can use either kronor or euro in restaurants and shops, as well as in payments of rent and bills. Dual pricing is used at many places and ATMs dispense either currency without additional charge (the latter is law all over Sweden). Around 60 percent of stores in the town are reported to have signed up to the scheme and local banks have developed guidelines to accept euro deposits. This decision was approved and agreed by municipality of Höganäs. Höganäs has developed a special euro logo for the city. It is not a law in Höganäs, just a recommendation. This has been a rather successful PR coup, with good coverage in newspapers, and it has been mentioned also in foreign newspapers.

Helsingborg, Landskrona and Malmö
Some shops accept euros, and price tags in euros exist in some tourist oriented shops, as in more cities in Sweden. Acceptance of and price tags in Danish kroner are probably more common. Euro (and Danish krone) are typically accepted at 24-hour open petrol stations, international fast food chains and at hotels.

Pajala and Övertorneå
The Pajala and Övertorneå municipalities have borders to Finland (and thus to the eurozone). The euro is often accepted in shops and sometimes shown on price tags, but there is no official adoption of the euro from the municipality point of view. There was a rejected political proposal to officially adopt the euro in Pajala.

Sollentuna
There was a political proposal in June 2009 from a party in the Sollentuna Municipality, that the municipality should adopt the euro as its parallel currency in 2010.

Stockholm
Stockholm is the most important tourist city in Sweden, measured as the number of nights spent by tourists. Some tourist-oriented shops accept euros, although there is no official policy from the municipality. Taxi services in Stockholm can be paid in euros. In 2009 there was a rejected political proposal to officially introduce the euro in Stockholm.

Cash machines
Some cash machines can dispense foreign currency. Usually euros, but sometimes British pounds, US dollars, Danish kroner or Norwegian kroner can be dispensed instead. All of these cash machines also dispense Swedish kronor. Most of these cash machines are located in major cities, international airports and border areas.

Presence of the euro in Swedish law and bank system
The euro is present in some elements of Swedish law, based on EU directives. For example, an EU directive states that all transactions in euros inside the EU shall have the same fees as euro transactions within the country concerned. 
The Swedish government has made an amendment which states that the directive also applies to krona-based transactions. This means, for example, that euros can be withdrawn without fees from Swedish banks at any ATM in the eurozone, and that krona- and euro-based transfers to bank accounts in the European Economic Area can be done over the internet without a sending fee. The receiving banks can still sometimes charge a fee for receiving the payment, though, although the same EU directive typically makes this impossible for euro-based transfers to eurozone countries. This is different from, for example, Denmark where banks are required to set the price for international euro transactions within the European Economic Area to the same price as for domestic Danish euro transactions (which does not have to be the same as the price for domestic Danish krone transactions). However, banks in Sweden still decide the exchange rate, and so are able to continue charging a small percentage for exchanging between kronor and euros when using card payments.

It is also now possible for limited companies (companies limited by shares) to have their accounts and share capital denominated in euros.
The law about money laundering is based on an EU directive and sets a limit of €5,000 for cash transactions to be investigated regarding origin of money and receipts to be claimed, by companies such as banks, car dealers etc.

Many more Swedish laws today include amounts in euro due to EU directives.

Plans
Most major political parties in Sweden, including the formerly governing coalition Alliance for Sweden (except the Center Party) and the currently governing Moderate Party, which won the 2022 election, are in principle in favour of introducing the euro.

Tommy Waidelich, then economic spokesperson for the Social Democratic Party, ruled out Swedish eurozone membership for the foreseeable future in August 2011.

The newspaper Sydsvenska Dagbladet claimed on 26 November 2007 (a few days after the former Danish Prime Minister, Anders Fogh Rasmussen, had announced plans to hold another referendum on abolishing Denmark's opt-outs including the opt-out from the euro) that the question of another euro referendum would be one of the central issues of the 2010 election in Sweden. Prime Minister Fredrik Reinfeldt stated in December 2007 that when more neighbours use the euro, it will be more visible that Sweden does not.

Swedish politician Olle Schmidt in an interview with journalists from the European Parliament 2008 when asked when Sweden will have good reasons to adopt the euro, he said "When the Baltic countries join the euro, the whole Baltic Sea will be surrounded by euro coins. Then the resistance will drop. I hope for a referendum in Sweden in 2010." Lithuania adopted euro as the last Baltic country in 2015, without creating much debate in Sweden.

The social democratic party leader Mona Sahlin at the time has 2008 stated that a new referendum will not occur in the period 2010–2013, because the 2003 referendum still counts.

2009 European elections

During the election campaign for the European Parliament elections, Liberal People's Party and Christian Democrats expressed interest in holding a second referendum on euro adoption. However, the Moderate Party and Centre Party thought that the time was ill-chosen.

Economic research
A 2009 economic study from J. James Reade (Oxford) and Ulrich Volz (German Development Institute) on the possible entry of Sweden in the eurozone has found that it would be likely to have a positive effect. The study of the evolution of the Swedish money market rates shows that they closely follow the euro rates, even during times of economic crisis. This shows that Sweden would not lose in terms of monetary policy autonomy, as the Swedish Central Bank already closely follows the rates set by the European Central Bank. When adopting the euro, Sweden would swap this autonomy on paper for a real influence on the European monetary policy thanks to the gaining of a seat in the ECB's governing council. Overall, the study concludes that "staying outside of the eurozone implies forgone benefits that Sweden, a small open economy with a sizable and internationally exposed financial sector, would enjoy from adopting an international currency."

Opinion polls
Prime Minister Fredrik Reinfeldt stated in December 2007 that there will be no referendum until there is stable support in the polls. The polls have generally showed a stable support for the "no" alternative, except some polls in 2009 which showed a support for "yes". Since 2010 opinion polls have shown a strong support for "no".

Results
Polls on the question whether Sweden should abolish the krona and join the euro are regularly carried out, usually by the state statistics agency Statistics Sweden (SCB). The results are always published in the press or online.

Public support for introducing the euro in Sweden according to Eurobarometer polls

Critique of polling questions
How the polling questions are phrased has a major impact on how people respond. The SCB polling question tends to measure if the electorate favor voting yes/no for Sweden to adopt the euro as soon as possible. However, polls conducted by TNS Polska in Poland showed that this question finds a large group of supporters of euro adoption would vote no to adopting the euro as soon as possible, but that a majority of them would vote yes if asked whether or not the state should adopt the euro ten years from now.

Swedish euro coins
There are no designs for potential Swedish euro coins. It was reported in the media that when Sweden changed the design of the 1-krona coin in 2001 it was in preparation for the euro. A newer portrait of the king was introduced. The 10-kronor coin already had a similar portrait. This in fact is from a progress report by the Riksbank on possible Swedish entry into the euro, which states that the lead in time for coin changeover could be reduced through using the portrait of King Carl XVI Gustaf introduced on the 1- and 10-kronor coins in 2001 as the national side on Swedish 1- and 2 euro coins.

Only the national bank can issue legal tender coins according to Swedish law. Some private collection mint companies have produced Swedish euro coins, claiming that they are copies of test coins made by the Riksbank.

Membership of the European Central Bank's Banking Union 

Since the rise in resolution fund fees for Swedish banks to protect against banking failures in 2017, resulting in the move of the headquarters of the biggest bank in Sweden and the entire Nordic region, Nordea, from Stockholm to the Finnish capital Helsinki, which lies within the eurozone and therefore also within the European Central Bank's Banking Union, there has been discussion about Sweden joining the banking union. Nordea's chairman of the board, Björn Wahlroos, stated that the bank wanted to put itself "on a par with its European peers" in justifying the relocation from Stockholm to Helsinki.

The main aim for joining the Banking Union is to protect Swedish banks against being "too big to fail". Sweden's Financial Markets Minister Per Bolund has said that the country is conducting a study on joining, which is planned to be completed by 2019. Critics argue that Sweden will be disadvantaged by joining the banking union because it does not have any voting rights, as it is not a member of the eurozone. Swedish former Finance Minister and former Prime Minister Magdalena Andersson stated: "You can't ignore the fact that the decision-making can be a little problematic for countries not in the eurozone."

See also 

 Economy of Sweden under Economic and Monetary Union and Trade unions
 Enlargement of the eurozone

Notes

References

External links
 Central bank 
 Central bank 

Economy of Sweden
Euro by country
Sweden and the European Union